Manuel Antonio Ribeiro de Castro, first baron with greatness of Santa Rita (8 November 1767 — 26 May 1854), was a Portuguese-born Brazilian merchant, plantation owner and politician.

Biography 
Castro was born in São Miguel de Caldas, then archbishopric of Braga, parish of the municipality of Guimarães, currently parish of the municipality of Vizela, Portugal.

In 1789 he was a merchant registered at the Royal Board of Trade of Lisbon. He emigrated to Brazil and settled in Vila de São Salvador de Campos (present-day Campos dos Goytacazes). As the region was experiencing a great development in sugar production, he became a prominent farmer.

Castro was the last captain-major of the former Vila de São Salvador de Campos dos Goytacazes.

He was a knight of the Imperial Order of Christ and an officer of the Order of the Rose.

He received the title of Baron of Santa Rita, referring to the parish of Santa Rita da Lagoa de Cima, currently the district of Ibitioca in Campos dos Goytacazes, where his Fazenda do Queimado was located. Greatness was granted by decree of 11 October 1848, although there was no rectification in the "Holders of the Empire".

He died on his farm of Queimado, parish of Santa Rita da Lagoa de Cima, in the municipality of Campos dos Goytacazes.

Genealogy 
Castro married on 24 May 1797 the camper D. Anna Francisca Baptista de Almeida Pinheiro, known as "The Fortune", a large landowner, widow of Captain Jerônimo Álvares Pereira, mother of Commander João de Almeida Pereira and grandmother of counselor João de Almeida Pereira Filho. The couple had the following children:

 Rachel Francisca Ribeiro de Castro, who married Manuel Pinto Neto da Cruz, the baron of Muriaé, and, already a widow, received the title of Viscountess of Muriaé;
 Francisca Antonia Ribeiro de Castro, who married José Carneiro da Silva, first baron and first grandiose viscount of Araruama;
 Commander Joaquim Ribeiro de Castro, who married his niece Anna Seraphina de Castro Carneiro da Silva, daughter of the first viscount of Araruama;
 Commander Jerônimo Ribeiro de Castro, who married his niece (through her mother's first marriage) Úrsula Carolina de Almeida Pereira, sister of the counselor João de Almeida Pereira Filho;
 Commander Francisco Ribeiro de Castro, who married Ana Teresa Diniz e Souza;
 Commander Antônio Ribeiro de Castro, who married his niece Ana Joaquina de Castro Netto, daughter of the Baron and Viscountess of Muriaé;
 Commander Julião Ribeiro de Castro, who married his niece Maria Isabel de Castro Carneiro da Silva, daughter of the first viscount of Araruama;
 Commander José Ribeiro de Castro, 2nd Baron and 1st Viscount of Santa Rita, who married his niece Maria Antonia de Castro Netto, daughter of the Baron and Viscountess of Muriaé;
 Ana Francisca Ribeiro de Castro, married to Doctor Francisco Baptista de Souza Cabral;
 Commander Manoel Antonio Ribeiro de Castro, married to Maria Ignácia do Souto-Maior.

See also 
 1st Baron of Araruama

References

Bibliography 

 Nobreza Brasileira de A a Z - Seção S-1
 QUEIRÓS MATOSO, Gilberto de. A Família Araruama. In. Edição Comemorativa do Cinqüentenário do Instituto Genealógico Brasileiro (1939-1989). São Paulo: Instituto Genealógico Brasileiro, 1991, pp. 321–29.
 LAMEGO, Alberto. A Terra Goytacá: Á luz de documentos inéditos. Niterói, RJ: Diário Oficial, Tomo Sexto, 1943.

External links 
 Manuel Antonio Ribeiro de Castro * 8 November 1767 † 25 May 1854 Rodovid (visitado em 2 de outubro de 2008)

1767 births
1854 deaths
Brazilian nobility
Portuguese people
Portuguese slave owners
Brazilian slave owners
Portuguese expatriates in Brazil
Portuguese politicians
18th-century people
People from Campos dos Goytacazes